Acacia longissima, known colloquially as long-leaf wattle or narrow-leaf wattle, is a species of Acacia native to eastern Australia.

Description
Like most species of Acacia it has phyllodes rather than true leaves. It blooms between January and May and fruits around November.

Taxonomy
The specific epithet is in reference to the long narrow phyllodes of this particular species.

Distribution
The plant is usually situated near the coast and is found as far north as Nambour and Nerang in south-eastern Queensland extending down the south coastal areas of New South Wales to around Batemans Bay. It is often found to inhabit the borders of rainforests or in wet or dry sclerophyll forest communities where it is often found in gullies growing in sandy to clay soils.

See also
 List of Acacia species

References

longissima
Fabales of Australia
Flora of New South Wales
Flora of Queensland
Plants described in 1820